Kozjak Hydro Power Plant is a large hydroelectric power plant on the river Treska which creates an artificial lake Kozjak, the largest in North Macedonia. It is located in the western part of the country in the municipality of Makedonski Brod. The primary purpose of the dam is flood control but it also serves for power generation.

The power plant has two turbines with a nominal capacity of 41 MW each having a total capacity of 82 MW.

The maximum elevation of the lake is 469.9 m and it has a capacity of about 380 million m³ of water. There is an abundance of fish in the lake.

The construction of the dam started in August 1994 and it was complete in 2000. The reservoir started filling in May 2003, and the two power generators finally operated in July and September 2004.

References

Hydroelectric power stations in North Macedonia
Lakes of North Macedonia
Dams completed in 2000
Energy infrastructure completed in 2004
Rock-filled dams
Dams in North Macedonia
Makedonski Brod Municipality